An Acheri is the ghost or spirit of a little girl who was either murdered or abused and left to die. Acheris are also referred to as "hill fairies." They are often depicted with dark or unnatural eyes, a skeletal appearance, and a skin dress. This does change throught diffferent culutres. They are talked about in Native american culture, and someitmes i Hindu culture. 

How native Amerian see Acheri. 

It is said that they sleep during the day in the mountains or hilltops and become active at night. They sing while playing a small tam-tam, and their voices are omens of the death of the person who hears it, or somebody (especially a child) close to that person. They are also said to bring disease to children (and sometimes others) who come in contact with them. The Acheri are also said to bring death to the elderly or other people who are quite ill.

Legend says to protect yourself from their curse, one must wear a bright red ribbon or red string tied around one's neck. Alternatively, one may wear red clothes or pearls.

References 
1. André-François Ruaud, The dictionary of Fey, the Oxymoron edition, 2002.

2. Michael Page, Robert Ingpen, Encyclopedia of Things That Never Were: Creatures, Places, and People, 1987.

3. 

4. 

Hindu legendary creatures
Ghosts